Adriana Camila Ampuero Barrientos (born 1987) is a Chilean lawyer who was elected as a member of the Chilean Constitutional Convention.

References

External links
 Profile at Lista del Pueblo

Living people
1987 births
21st-century Chilean politicians
Members of the List of the People
Members of the Chilean Constitutional Convention
21st-century Chilean women politicians
21st-century Chilean lawyers
Chilean women lawyers
Pontifical Catholic University of Valparaíso alumni